Erik Petersen may refer to:

Erik Petersen (rower) (born 1939), Danish Olympic rower
Erik Petersen (musician), founder of Philadelphia band Mischief Brew
Erik Petersen (footballer), Danish footballer who was the top-goalscorer of the 1939 Danish football championship

See also
Erik Pedersen (born 1967), former Norwegian footballer
Erik Pedersen (ice hockey) (born 1955), Norwegian ice hockey player
Erik Bue Pedersen (born 1952), Danish handball player 
Eric Petersen, American actor
Eric Peterson, Canadian actor
Eric Peterson (musician), American guitarist
Erik Peterson (disambiguation)
Erik Pettersson (disambiguation)